The 2014 ITU World Triathlon Series was a series of eight World Championship Triathlon events that lead up to a Grand Final held in Edmonton, Alberta, Canada. The Series was organised under the auspices of the world governing body of triathlon, the International Triathlon Union (ITU). At the conclusion of the series Javier Gómez of Spain and Gwen Jorgensen of the United States were declared the 2014 ITU World Champions.

Calendar
The 2014 series visited eight cities around the world.

Results

Medal summary

Men

Women

Overall standings
The athlete who accumulates the most points throughout the 8 race season is declared the year's world champion. The final point standings are:

Men

Women

References

2014
World Triathlon Series
International sports competitions hosted by Canada
2014 ITU World Triathlon Series
World Triathlon Series